National Route 12 or N12 is one of the main national roads of Morocco. It runs from Sidi Ifni on the Atlantic coast through Guelmim, Assa, Akka, Tata, and Foum Zguid to Zagora, passing Alnife National Park along its course , all the way to The city of  Rissani , at the tafilalte oases , Most of the road is good. There is very little traffic , highly used by bikers and off-road vehicles , longing the east of Morocco unplugged , along the anti Atlas Mountains , then west to the Atlantic coast , the city of sidi ifni .

Roads in Morocco